Batur Stadium is a privately-owned football stadium in Gaziantep, Turkey.

Batur Stadium is located at İbrahim Tevfik Kutlar St. 41 in 25 Aralık Neighborhood of Şahinbey district in Gaziantep, Turkey. It is home to the football clubs  ALG Spor in the Women's Super League, Gaziantep Gençlerbirliği in the Super Amateur Leagues, Işın Boru Yıldızspor and Saraygücü 1983 Spor.

References 

Football venues in Turkey
Sport in Gaziantep
ALG Spor
Buildings and structures in Gaziantep